Rolf Wickstrøm (9 December 1912 in Oslo, Norway – 10 September 1941) was a Norwegian labour activist and a victim of the German occupation of Norway during World War II.

Wickstrøm grew up in a working-class family. In 1935 he was hired as a welder on the rapidly expanding Skabo Jernbanevognfabrikk, the Skabo Rail Coach Factory.  Dating from  January 1940, he was labour representative and shop stewart at  Skabo. He was arrested at Møllergata 19 in Oslo from 2 May to 26 May 1941.

Wickstrøm was executed during the state of martial law which followed the so-called milk strike (Melkestreiken), together with the labour lawyer Viggo Hansteen. The reason for the strike was that food supplies had become increasingly worse by September 1941. These two were the first labour representatives to be executed during the German occupation, and as such gained a great symbolic value for the continued resistance. Wickstrøm left behind his wife Signe (1913-1996) and son Tore (born 1938). After the war, Hansteen and Rolf Wickstrøm were buried in Vår Frelsers gravlund.

Viggo Hansteen and Rolf Wickstrøm were honored by the naming of a section of road around Oslo which bears their names. In 1948,  a memorial was erected in granite with bronze relief at the site of execution at Årvoll in the Bjerke district  of Oslo. The memorial was directed by Norwegian sculptor Nic Schiøll (1901–1984). It bears the following:

References

Other sources
Berntsen, Harald (1995) To liv - én skjebne: Viggo Hansteen og Rolf Wickstrøm (Oslo: Aschehoug) 

1912 births
1941 deaths
Trade unionists from Oslo
Norwegian people executed by Nazi Germany
Norwegian civilians killed in World War II
Deaths by firearm in Norway
People executed by Germany by firing squad
Burials at the Cemetery of Our Saviour